The MCW Tag Team Championship is a professional wrestling tag team championship owned by the MCW Pro Wrestling promotion. The title was created and debuted on August 18, 1998, at a MCW live event.

The inaugural champions were The Headbangers (Mosh and Thrasher), who defeated Jimmy Cicero and Julio Sanchez in the finals of a tournament to win the championship on August 18, 1998, at an MCW live event.

Title history

Combined reigns 

By team

By wrestler

Notes 
1. – Each reign is ranked highest to lowest; reigns with the exact same number mean that they are tied for that certain rank.

References 
General

Specific

External links 
MarylandWrestling.com
 MCW Tag Team Championship

MCW Pro Wrestling championships
Tag team wrestling championships